The Chiwaukum Mountains are a north–south mountain range in central Washington, United States.

The mountains are made of schist,  part of the Nason terrane. The original rock in the Nason terrane was laid down 210 Myr ago. The terrane then smashed into the western coastline of the continent, and the Mount Stuart batholith intruded into it in the late Cretaceous. The intrusion of the granitic rock metamorphosed the rock into schist.

In July 2014, the lightning-caused Chiwaukum Creek Fire burned the east flank of the Chiwaukum Mountains.

Partial list of peaks:
 Big Chiwaukum		    – 8,081' (2463m) – 
 Snowgrass Mountain	– 7,993' (2436m) – 
 Big Lou	– 7,780' (2370m) – 
 Big Jim Mountain		– 7,765' (2367m) – 
 Ladies Peak	– 7,708' (2349m) – 
 Grindstone Mountain	– 7,533' (2296m) – 
 Cape Horn	– 7,316' (2230m) – 
 Bulls Tooth		    – 6,840' (2080m) – 

Nearby peaks:
 Jim Hill Mountain	    – 6,765' (2062m) – 
 Arrowhead Mountain	    – 6,020' (1835m) – 
 Cowboy Mountain		– 5,853' (1784m) –

See also
 Chiwaukum Lake
 List of mountain ranges in Washington
 List of lakes of the Alpine Lakes Wilderness

References

Cascade Range
Mountain ranges of Washington (state)
Landforms of Chelan County, Washington